Norman MacKenzie or Mackenzie may refer to:

 Norman MacKenzie (politician) (1894–1986), Canadian politician
 Norman Mackenzie (conductor), conductor
 Norman Mackenzie (1869–1936), Canadian lawyer and arts patron whose collection became the Norman Mackenzie Art Gallery
 Norman MacKenzie (journalist) (1921–2013), British writer, journalist and educationalist